7.5 cm Pak 39 (L/48) (7.5 cm Panzerjägerkanone 39) was a 7.5 cm German Second World War era anti-tank gun. The gun was used to equip Jagdpanzer IV/48 and Jagdpanzer 38 tank destroyers; no towed version of the weapon was made. The Pak 39 was an electrically fired weapon fitted with a semi-automatic breech mechanism and a 48 caliber long barrel. The gun was able to destroy the most common allied tanks at up to 1,000 meters. It used the same 75 x 495R ammunition as the 7.5 cm KwK 40 of Panzer IV and 7.5 cm StuK 40 gun fitted on the Sturmgeschütz assault guns. The Pak 39 was manufactured from 1943 onwards by Rheinmetall-Borsig AG in Unterlüß and by Seitz-Werke GmbH in Bad Kreuznach. The main types of ammunition used were: Panzergranatpatrone 39 (APCBC), Sprenggranatpatrone 37 (HE) and different versions of the Granatpatrone 39 HL (HEAT).

Technical data
Complete designation: 7.5 cm Panzerjägerkanone 39 (L/48)
Type: Anti-tank gun
Caliber: 7.5 cm (2.95 in)
Cartridge: 75×495 mm. R
Barrel length: 48 calibers 
Muzzle velocity:  (Panzergranate 39 AP shell)
Weight: 
Barrel life: 5000-7000 rounds
Main types of ammunition:
Panzergranatpatrone 39 (Pzgr.Patr. 39)
Sprenggranatpatrone 37 (Sprgr. Patr. 37)
Granatpatrone 39 HL (Gr. Patr. 39 HL)

Notes

References

World War II anti-tank guns of Germany
75 mm artillery
Weapons and ammunition introduced in 1943